Kragten may refer to:
Hattie Kragten, Canadian actress
Isaac Kragten (born 2002), Canadian actor